Zahid Ilyas was a Vice admiral and was a flag officer in the Pakistan Navy. He was serving as Deputy Chief of the Naval Staff (Training and Personnel), DCNS-T&P at Naval Headquarters in Islamabad, he took the office as Head of Trainning and Personnel branch of Pakistan Navy. Prior to assuming Special Service Group in 2021 his previous assignments include commanding officer PNS Babur and PNS Zulfiquar. He was also appointed to Pakistan Naval Academy as a commanding officer.

He graduated from the Pakistan Naval War College and the National Defence University besides obtaining a master's degree in military operational research from the UK and naval command course from China.

Career 
He joined the Pakistan Navy in 1984 and got commissioned in Operations branch in 1988. He served at various posts and units throughout his career such as commander of the 18th destroyer squadron and Combined Task Force 151 for Pakistan headquartered in Bahrain. At staff assignments, his was appointed as principal secretary to Chief of Naval Staff, Director General C4I and Deputy Chief of the Naval Staff,Training & Evaluation in Islamabad. During his career, he also served as director general at Joint Cantonment Gwadar Branch in Rawalpindi.

Effective dates of promotion

References 

Living people
Date of birth missing (living people)
Place of birth missing (living people)
Pakistan Navy admirals
National Defence University, Pakistan alumni
Pakistan Naval War College alumni
Recipients of Hilal-i-Imtiaz
Year of birth missing (living people)